Manciola is a genus of skinks. It contains one species, Manciola guaporicola, which is found in South America (Brazil, Bolivia, and Paraguay). It is also known as Dunn's mabuya or South American small-handed skink.

References

Skinks
Monotypic lizard genera
Taxa named by Stephen Blair Hedges
Taxa named by Caitlin E. Conn